Tatiana Vanessa Ferreira Pinto (born 28 March 1994) is a Portuguese professional footballer who plays as a midfielder for Liga Iberdrola club Levante Unión Deportiva and the Portugal national team.

After spells abroad with SC Sand and Bristol City, Pinto returned to her home country in summer 2016. She signed with the newly formed women's team of Sporting CP; the club she supports. In 2020, she ended her contract with Sporting and signed for Levante UD.

International goals

References

External links
 
 Player national profile at Portuguese Football Federation 
 

1994 births
Living people
People from Oliveira do Bairro
Portuguese women's footballers
Portugal women's international footballers
Portuguese expatriate women's footballers
Expatriate women's footballers in Germany
Expatriate women's footballers in England
Portuguese expatriate sportspeople in Germany
Portuguese expatriate sportspeople in England
Women's Super League players
SC Sand players
Bristol City W.F.C. players
Women's association football midfielders
Campeonato Nacional de Futebol Feminino players
Valadares Gaia F.C. (women) players
Sporting CP (women's football) players
Clube de Albergaria players
Levante UD Femenino players
Sportspeople from Aveiro District
UEFA Women's Euro 2022 players
UEFA Women's Euro 2017 players